This is a list of all tornadoes that were confirmed by local offices of the National Weather Service in the United States from January to February 2007.

United States Yearly Total

Note: January tornadoes were rated using the old Fujita scale, but are included in the chart above by matching the F rating to the related EF scale rating.

January

January 4 event

January 5 event

January 7 event

January 12 event

January 13 event

February
February 1, 2007 marked the changeover to the Enhanced Fujita Scale.

February 2 event

February 13 event

February 23 event

February 24 event

February 25 event

February 28 event

See also
Tornadoes of 2007

Notes

References

Tornadoes of 2007
2007, 01
January 2007 events in the United States
February 2007 events in the United States